Frontenac—Mégantic was a federal electoral district in Quebec, Canada, that was represented in the House of Commons of Canada from 1997 to 2004.

It was created in 1996 from the Mégantic—Compton—Stanstead riding. It was abolished in 2003 when it was redistributed into Beauce, Compton—Stanstead and Mégantic—L'Érable ridings.

It consisted of:
 the cities of Black Lake, Disraeli, Lac-Mégantic, Scotstown and Thetford Mines;
 the County Regional Municipality of L'Amiante;
 the County Regional Municipality of Le Granit, excepting: the municipalities of Risborough and Saint-Robert-Bellarmin; the Municipality of the United Townships of Risborough-et-partie-de-Marlow;
 in the County Regional Municipality of Le Haut-Saint-François: the village municipalities of La Patrie, Saint-Gérard and Weedon Centre; the township municipalities of Ditton, Hampden, Lingwick and Weedon; the municipalities of Chartierville and Fontainebleau.

Members of Parliament

This riding elected the following Members of Parliament:

The riding was a swing riding between the Liberal Party and the Bloc Québécois.

Election results

See also 

 List of Canadian federal electoral districts
 Past Canadian electoral districts

External links
Riding history from the Library of Parliament

Former federal electoral districts of Quebec
Thetford Mines